Anton Ferdinand Count Mittrowsky von Mittrowitz und Nemyšl, or Anton Mittrovsky, (1745 – 30 September 1809) served in the Habsburg army for many years. He was promoted to general officer in the spring of 1796, just in time to lead a brigade against Napoleon Bonaparte during the 1796-1797 Italian Campaign of the French Revolutionary Wars. He played a pivotal role in the Battle of Arcole, nearly defeating Bonaparte. He fought in Italy again in 1805 during the Napoleonic Wars and became the Proprietor (Inhaber) of an Austrian infantry regiment from 1806 until his death three years later.

War of the First Coalition
Born into a military family around 1745, Mittrowsky joined the Habsburg army and, much later in his career, served as Oberst (colonel) of the Callenberg Infantry Regiment # 54. He received his promotion to the rank of General-Major on 30 April 1796. During the first relief of the Siege of Mantua, he led a brigade in Paul Davidovich's III Column. Detached from his parent column, he occupied the Chiusa fort and scouted toward Verona. At the Battle of Castiglione on 5 August, he defended the right flank against André Masséna's attacks.

During the third relief of Mantua, Mittrowsky's 3,000-man brigade held the upper Brenta River valley as a link between the Tyrol Corps and the Friaul Corps. After Jozsef Alvinczi reached the Brenta with the Friaul Corps, Mittrowsky joined it and participated in the Second Battle of Bassano on 6 November 1796.

When Bonaparte suddenly crossed the Adige River on the morning of 15 November, Mittrowsky lay nearby with three battalions. He played a prominent role during all three days of the Battle of Arcole. By early afternoon on the first day, his troops reinforced the village of Arcole. By virtue of seniority, Mittrowsky assumed command over the soldiers of Colonel Wenzel Brigido as well as his own. His troops stubbornly held the village all day, but the French forced his troops out of Arcole late that evening. He reoccupied the place when Bonaparte withdrew the isolated French force. On the second day, Alvinczi entrusted him with 14 battalions and gave him instructions to drive the French into the Adige. The order proved impossible to carry out because the French were too numerous, but Mittrowsky's capable defense of Arcole on the 16th kept Bonaparte's troops at bay. On 17 November he came close to defeating Bonaparte. The French finally drove the Austrians from the village at 5 pm on the third day, but only after drawing troops from the other wing of their army.

Mittrowsky missed the Battle of Rivoli in January 1797, being employed in guarding the Brenta valley with a 3,500-man brigade.

Later career
The outbreak of the War of the Second Coalition found Mittrowsky serving in the army of Italy under Pál Kray. He fought at the drawn Battle of Verona on 26 March 1799. A little over a week later, he led a brigade in Karl Mercandin's column at the Battle of Magnano. During the Battle of Novi in August 1799, his brigade fought with the left wing under the overall supervision of Michael von Melas. Mittrowsky was elevated in rank to Feldmarschall-Leutnant in October 1799.

Mittrowsky led a division in the army of Archduke Charles at the Battle of Caldiero in late October 1805. During the period 1806-1809, he was deputy to the commanding general in Upper and Lower Austria and Salzburg. Emperor Francis II appointed him proprietor of the Anton Mittrowsky Infantry Regiment # 10 in 1806. (A relative, Joseph Anton Franz Mittrowsky was proprietor of Infantry Regiment # 40 from 1786 to 1808.) Anton Mittrowsky remained proprietor through the War of the Fifth Coalition until his death in Vienna on 30 September 1809.

Footnotes

References

Printed materials
 Boycott-Brown, Martin. The Road to Rivoli. London: Cassell & Co., 2001. 
 Chandler, David. The Campaigns of Napoleon. New York: Macmillan, 1966.
 
 Smith, Digby. The Napoleonic Wars Data Book. London: Greenhill, 1998.

External links
 napoleon-series.org Battle of Verona by Enrico Acerbi
 historydata.org Mittrovsky biography by Martin Boycott-Brown
 napoleon-series.org Austrian Infantry Regiments by Stephen Millar
 napoleon-series.org Austrian Generals: Mittrowsky by Digby Smith, compiled by Leopold Kudrna

1745 births
1809 deaths
18th-century Austrian people
Austrian soldiers
Austrian generals
Austrian people of Czech descent
Bohemian nobility
Military leaders of the French Revolutionary Wars
Austrian Empire military leaders of the French Revolutionary Wars
Austrian Empire commanders of the Napoleonic Wars